Somo is an unincorporated community in Mason County, Kentucky, United States. The closest incorporated settlement is Lewisburg, Kentucky.

Somo lies on the intersection of Kentucky Route 9 and Kentucky Route 3313. The community is approximately 2.5 miles away from the Ohio River, and by extension the Ohio state border.

Notes

Unincorporated communities in Mason County, Kentucky
Unincorporated communities in Kentucky